Lower Wolfjaw Mountain is located in Essex County, New York. Landscape artist Alexander Helwig Wyant (1836–1892) named Lower Wolfjaw, together with neighboring Upper Wolfjaw Mountain, about 1870 for their appearance in profile. The mountain is the northeasternmost of the Adirondack High Peaks in the Great Range of the Adirondack Mountains. Lower Wolfjaw Mountain is flanked to the southwest by Upper Wolfjaw Mountain, and to the northeast by Hedgehog Mountain.

Lower Wolfjaw Mountain stands within the watershed of the East Branch of the Ausable River, which drains into Lake Champlain, thence into Canada's Richelieu River, the Saint Lawrence River, and into the Gulf of Saint Lawrence. The east and southeast sides of Lower Wolfjaw Mtn. drain into Wedge Brook, thence into the East Branch of the Ausable River. The west side of Lower Wolfjaw Mountain drains into Wolfjaw Brook, thence into Johns Brook and the East Branch. The north side of Lower Wolfjaw drains into Bennies Brook, thence into Johns Brook. The northeast end of Lower Wolfjaw drains into Rock Cut Brook, thence into Johns Brook.

Lower Wolfjaw Mountain is within the High Peaks Wilderness Area of New York's Adirondack Park.

See also 
 List of mountains in New York
 Northeast 111 4,000-footers
 Adirondack High Peaks
 Adirondack Forty-Sixers

References

External links 
 

Mountains of Essex County, New York
Adirondack High Peaks
Mountains of New York (state)